The Women's synchronized 10 metre platform competition at the 2019 World Aquatics Championships was held on 14 July 2019.

Results
The preliminary round was started at 10:00. The final was started at 20:45.

Green denotes finalists

References

Women's synchronized 10 metre platform